Thyenula sempiterna is a jumping spider species in the genus Thyenula that lives in Zimbabwe and South Africa. The female was first described in 2000 and the male in 2014.

References

Spiders described in 2000
Arthropods of Zimbabwe
Salticidae
Spiders of Africa
Spiders of South Africa